Melissa Fifield (born August 7, 1992) is an American racing driver and spokesperson. She primarily races in the NASCAR Whelen Modified Tour, driving the No. 01 Chevrolet for her family-owned team.

Racing career 
Fifield grew up watching races with her family at a young age. She received her first go-kart at 11-years old, and competed in nearby racetracks. She won the Londonderry Track Championship in her rookie season, and eventually drove in the World Karting Association, where she ranked 4th in the national standings. She drove in the Allison Legacy Series at 14 years old, racing in the North and South series. She had her first and only Legacy Series win at the New London-Waterford Speedbowl in 2011.

NASCAR Whelen Modified Tour

2014–present 
Fifield moved up to the NASCAR Whelen Modified Tour full-time in 2014, racing for her family-owned team. She recorded her best finish of 19th at Thompson Speedway and New Hampshire Motor Speedway. She finished 21st in the final point standings and won the Most Popular Driver Award that season.

Throughout her career in the Whelen Modified Tour, she would always start each race, with most of them being ended early from mechanical issues. She had her career-best finish of 15th at Wall Stadium in 2019. She followed with a 16th-place finish at Jennerstown Speedway in 2021. She is expected to return to another full-time season in 2022.

Criticism 
From 2014 to 2016, Fifield won the Whelen Modified Tour Most Popular Driver award, and would often get criticized on social media, due to her driving performance and being several seconds behind the pace. Fifield said, "I've never had anybody make a comment at a pit party or off the track or anything there. Everybody kind of just has the courage to say what they want on the computer, but they'll never say it to your face. People don't have the courage to say something."

Personal life 
Fifield is currently a spokesperson for the New Hampshire Office of Highway Safety. Because of her efforts, she received a commendation from New Hampshire governor Chris Sununu in 2017. Sununu stated that she is "one of the best race car drivers in the world, and one of the top few female race car drivers in the world lives right here in New Hampshire and she doesn't get nearly the recognition she deserves."

Fifield was featured on the cover of New Hampshire Women Magazine in September 2018, which talks about her NASCAR career.

She also worked with the Children's Hospital at Dartmouth-Hitchcock Medical Center (CHaD), where she would interview high school students about making good decisions in life, and their future goals.

Fifield and her family currently run and operate Pine Knoll Auto Sales, a car dealership in her hometown of Wakefield, New Hampshire, which is also the location of her race shop.

On February 14, 2022, Anheuser-Busch brands announced the formation of a new program, called the Busch Light Accelerate Her Program, a program that allows female drivers who are 21 years old or older, to get more funding, track time, media exposure, and training for NASCAR. Fifield is one of the recipients for the program.

Motorsports career results

NASCAR
(key) (Bold – Pole position awarded by qualifying time. Italics – Pole position earned by points standings or practice time. * – Most laps led.)

Whelen Modified Tour

Whelen Southern Modified Tour

References

External links 

Living people
1992 births
NASCAR drivers
Racing drivers from New Hampshire
People from Wakefield, New Hampshire